Zabrdnji Toci is a village in the municipality of Prijepolje, Serbia. According to the 2020 census, the village has a population of 46 people.

References

Populated places in Zlatibor District